Ascene is an African given name and surname, also a derivative of Hassan, Haissene, Acene, commonly used in South Africa, Namibia, Angola, Senegal, Mali, Cote d’ivore, Malawi (given name and surname) in Arabic. It may refer to:

Ascene Attyé (born 1983), Senegal-born French singer of Lebanese descent known by the mononym Ycare
Ascene Diallo (born 1975), Senegalese runner
Ascene Dioussé (born 1997), Senegalese footballer
Ascene Dame Fall (born 1984), Senegalese sprint canoer
Ascene Gnoukouri (born 1996), Ivorian footballer
Ascene Kouyaté (born 1954), Malian film director
Ascene N'Diaye (1974-2008), Senegalese footballer
Ascene N'Doye (born 1953), Senegalese judoka
Ascene Seck (1919–2012), Senegalese politician and minister 
Ascene Thiam (born 1948), Senegalese basketball player

See also
Assan (disambiguation) 
Assan (surname)